This article lists current and upcoming games for the PlayStation VR headset.

There are  titles on this page.

Games

Free-to-play

See also 

 List of PlayStation 4 games
 List of PlayStation applications
 List of Oculus Rift games
 List of Oculus Quest games
 List of HTC Vive games

Notes

References 

PlayStation VR games
VR games
 
PlayStation VR games